A trailer bike (also known as a trailer cycle, and trademarked names such as Trailerbike, Trail-a-bike, Half wheeler or Tagalong) is a one-wheeled, or sometimes two-wheeled, bicycle trailer designed to carry one or more children in positions that closely resemble that of a bicycle rider. It can be described as the, "back half of a bicycle." The rider of a trailer bike usually has a saddle, handlebars, and pedals. Some fold for more compact storage.

History
The trailer bike was patented by Canadian entrepreneur Delbert Adams. Adams started the manufacturer of trailer bikes, Trail-a-Bike, and began selling them in the early 1990s, although the same concept had been previously independently and imitatively invented by others at least as far back as the 1930s with the Rann Trailer.

Configurations
Trailer bikes have come in a variety of configurations. These include upright-bicycle-like seating, and recumbent-bicycle-like seating as with the Weehoo iGo. Trailer bikes have been available in single-seat and tandem configurations. Trailer bikes may have just one gear or more than one. They seldom have brakes.

Attachments
A trailer bike is attached to a bicycle at either the seatpost or on a special rear rack by a linkage that allows for pivoting. Alternatively, the hitch mechanism may rotate using the seatpost as the pivot.  The attachment may include a quick-release option.

Variations
The Trail-Gator tow bar and FollowMe Tandem coupling are two products that convert an existing, complete kid's bike into a trailer bike.

Gallery

See also

 Outline of cycling
Quadracycle (human-powered vehicle)
 Tandem bicycle
Tricycle

References

Cycling equipment
Utility cycling